Kostrzyca may refer to the following places in Poland:
Kostrzyca, Lower Silesian Voivodeship (south-west Poland)
Kostrzyca, Pomeranian Voivodeship (north Poland)